The 27th Edition Vuelta a España (Tour of Spain), a long-distance bicycle stage race and one of the three grand tours, was held from 27 April to 14 May 1972. Fuente also won the mountains classification while Domingo Perurena won the points classification.

Teams and riders

Route

Results

Final General Classification

References

 
Vuelta a España
1972
Vuelta a España
Vuelta a España
Vuelta a España
1972 Super Prestige Pernod